Amauri Torezan (born November 17, 1972) is a Brazilian abstract artist currently living in South Florida in the United States. Torezan’s paintings are currently part of collections throughout USA, Europe, and Brazil.

Career
The early stage of his career was marked by a series of surrealist portraits using photo collage. Later, due to his interest in the futuristic modern lifestyle in the middle of the 20th century, Torezan began to explore abstract art developing a signature style that can be seen in his work exhibited in Museums, Public Murals, and Art Galleries.

In 2016 Torezan collaborated with the Swiss watchmaker TAG Heuer, presenting his line of hand-painted Tag watch straps during his solo show at the brand’s store in Miami.

Selected exhibitions
 The Baker Museum, Florida Contemporary
 Coral Springs Museum of Art, Inspire 2016
 Global Code Project
 SaveArtSpace
 Canvas Outdoor Museum 2015 (local showdown)

References

Living people
1972 births
Abstract artists
Brazilian contemporary artists
Brazilian painters